Rhys "Tommy" Thomson (August 9, 1918 – October 12, 1993) was a Canadian professional ice hockey defenceman who played 25 games in the National Hockey League for the Montreal Canadiens and Toronto Maple Leafs between 1940 and 1942. The rest of his career, which lasted from 1938 to 1946, was spent in various minor leagues.

Thomson was born in Toronto, Ontario.

Career statistics

Regular season and playoffs

External links
 

1918 births
1993 deaths
Canadian ice hockey defencemen
Montreal Canadiens players
Ice hockey people from Toronto
New Haven Eagles players
Ontario Hockey Association Senior A League (1890–1979) players
Providence Reds players
Springfield Indians players
Toronto Maple Leafs players
Toronto Young Rangers players